Europium(III) oxide (Eu2O3), is a chemical compound of europium and oxygen. It is widely used as a red or blue phosphor in television sets and fluorescent lamps, and as an activator for yttrium-based phosphors. It is also an agent for the manufacture of fluorescent glass. Europium fluorescence is used in the anti-counterfeiting phosphors in Euro banknotes.

Europium oxide has two common structures: Monoclinic (mS30, space group C2/m, No. 12) and cubic (cI80, space group Ia, No. 206). The cubic structure is similar to that of manganese(III) oxide. 

It may be formed by ignition of europium metal.

It can react with acids to form the corresponding europium(III) salts.

Gallery

References

Europium(III) compounds
Glass engineering and science
Sesquioxides